The Mayor of Kuala Lumpur is the chief executive for the local government of Kuala Lumpur, the capital and largest city of Malaysia. Each year, the Mayor of Kuala Lumpur presents the Kuala Lumpur city budget to the Kuala Lumpur City Hall. He is charged with managing an annual budget of MYR 2.905 billion (as of 2018)

Chronological list

Appointed mayors of Kuala Lumpur
Since 1972, the city has been led by thirteen mayors. The previous mayors are listed as below:

References

 
Kuala Lumpur
Lists of political office-holders in Malaysia